rkhunter (Rootkit Hunter) is a Unix-based tool that scans for rootkits, backdoors and possible local  exploits. It does this by comparing SHA-1 hashes of important files with known good ones in online databases, searching for default directories (of rootkits), wrong permissions, hidden files, suspicious strings in kernel modules, and special tests for Linux and FreeBSD. rkhunter is notable due to its inclusion in popular operating systems (Fedora, Debian, etc.)

The tool has been written in Bourne shell, to allow for portability. It can run on almost all UNIX-derived systems.

Development 
In 2003, developer Michael Boelen released the version of Rootkit Hunter. After several years of development, early 2006, he agreed to hand over development to a development team. Since that time eight people have been working to set up the project properly and work towards the much-needed maintenance release. The project has since been moved to SourceForge.

See also 

 chkrootkit
 Lynis
 OSSEC
 Samhain (software)
 Host-based intrusion detection system comparison
 Hardening (computing)
 Linux malware
 MalwareMustDie
 Rootkit

References

External links
 
 Old rkhunter web page

Computer security software
Unix security-related software
Rootkit detection software